Hrvoje Petek (born January 13, 1958) is a Croatian-born American physicist and the Richard King Mellon Professor of Physics and Astronomy, at the University of Pittsburgh, where he is also a professor of chemistry.

Education 
Petek received his B.S. degree in chemistry from Massachusetts Institute of Technology in 1980. Subsequently, he obtained his Ph.D. degree in chemistry from the University of California, Berkeley in 1985.

Research and career 
Petek has developed coherent photoelectron spectroscopy and microscopy as methods for studying the dephasing and spatial propagation of polarization fields in solid state materials and nanostructure. He is developing methods for multidimensional multiphoton-photoemission spectroscopy. Together with Taketoshi Minato, Yousoo Kim, Maki Kawai, Jin Zhao, Jinlong Yang and Jianguo Hou, Petek discovered a delocalized electronic structure created by oxygen vacancy on titanium dioxide surface. Together with Jin Zhao, Ken Jordan and Ken Onda, Petek also discovered wet electron states, where electrons are partially solvated by water and other protic solvents at molecule vacuum interfaces. Together with Min Feng and Jin Zhao, Petek discovered atom-like superatom states of C60, and similar hollow molecules. Petek's research of metal plasmon excitations with semiconductor substrates, unrevealed the charge injection from optically active plasmonic modes into semiconductor substrates.

Petek is Editor-in-Chief of Progress in Surface Science and has organized conferences such as the 11th International Symposium of Ultrafast Surface Dynamics, held in Qiandao Lake, China. Petek has been (2015-2019) a member of the National Research and Development Agency Committee for the National Institute for Materials Science and is currently a senior scientific advisor to the Japanese Institute for Molecular Science.

Awards and honors 

2019 Ahmed Zewail Award in Ultrafast Science and Technology
2018 American Association for the Advancement of Science Fellows
2005 Chancellor's Distinguished Research Award, University of Pittsburgh
2002 Fellow, American Physical Society
2000 Alexander von Humboldt Research Award
1996–1999, 2003–2006 NEDO Joint International Research Grant Awardee

References

External links
 Petek Research Lab – Official website

1958 births
Living people
20th-century American chemists
21st-century American chemists
Massachusetts Institute of Technology School of Science alumni
University of California, Berkeley alumni
University of Pittsburgh faculty
Croatian emigrants to the United States
Scientists from Zagreb
Academic journal editors
Spectroscopists
Humboldt Research Award recipients
Fellows of the American Physical Society
Fellows of the American Association for the Advancement of Science
20th-century American physicists
21st-century American physicists